Bovill is a surname. Notable people with the surname include:

 C. H. Bovill (1878–1918), writer
 Elliot Bovill, Chief Justice of the Straits Settlements
 Frederick Bovill, Victorian era opera singer
 James Bovill, (born 1971), cricketer
 William Bovill (1814–1873), judge